Signora Bovary is an album of Italian singer-songwriter Francesco Guccini. It was released in 1987 by EMI.

The album
"Signora Bovary" is a poetic variation of Gustave Flaubert's 1857 novel Madame Bovary. "Culodritto" is dedicated to Guccini's daughter, Teresa, who was 9 at the time. "Van Loon" is about Guccini's father, who was a reader of the books of the 1930s science writer Hendrik Willem van Loon.  The long suite "Keaton" was co-written by Claudio Lolli, who had found difficulties in releasing it: as Guccini liked it, he published in his new album after minor modification. The last stanzas deals with the American actor Buster Keaton.

Personnel
Francesco Guccini - voice and guitar
Juan Carlos "Flaco" Biondini - guitars
Ares Tavolazzi - bass
Ellade Bandini - drums
Vince Tempera - piano, keyboards
Antonio Marangolo  - saxophone
Juan José Mosalini - bandoneon

Track listing 

"Scirocco" (5:40)
"Signora Bovary" (4:36)
"Van Loon" (5:44)
"Culodritto" (2:39)
"Keaton" (10:12)
"Le piogge d'aprile"  (3:51)
"Canzone di notte N°3" (5:20)

1987 albums
Adaptations of works by Gustave Flaubert
Francesco Guccini albums